The Yunus Centre, in Dhaka, Bangladesh is a think tank for issues related to social business, working in the field of poverty alleviation and sustainability. It is 'aimed primarily at promoting and disseminating Professor Yunus’ philosophy, with a special focus on social business' and currently chaired by Prof. Muhammad Yunus. Its Executive Director is Ms. Lamiya Morshed.

History 
After Prof. Muhammad Yunus and the Grameen Bank received the Nobel Peace Prize in October 2006, a personal office for Prof. Yunus under the name of ‘Yunus Secretariat’ was formed. From the very beginning on, the Yunus Secretariat was mainly aiming at promoting Prof. Yunus’ philosophy of social business and served as a one-stop resource centre for anyone interested in social business.

In July 2008, it was renamed the Yunus Centre and continues to develop new social businesses, provide technical help to social business start-ups and liaise with anybody interested in the topic. They also publish a quarterly newsletter on new developments in the field of social business.

Activities 
 Poverty-Free World campaign
Yunus Centre is working to promote the United Nations Millennium Development Goals in Bangladesh and all around the world and is especially committed for making Bangladesh free of poverty by 2030.

 Research and publications
Disseminating the ideas and philosophy of Prof. Yunus on social business and microfinance.

 Social business
Acting as the primary source of information on social businesses worldwide and providing consulting services to start-ups.
Its New Entrepreneur Project funded 385 projects in 2014.

The Global Social Business Summit
Created in 2009 by Yunus Centre and Grameen Creative Lab, the Global Social Business Summit has become the main platform for social businesses worldwide to encourage discussions, actions and collaborations in order to find effective solutions to crucial problems plaguing the world.

Academic programs
Developing curricula for classes on social business. Amongst other, current partnerships exist with Harvard University, HEC (Paris), the Asian Institute of Technology (Bangkok), Bocconi University (Milan) McGill University (Montreal), Glasgow University, University of Florence and University of Salford.

See also
 Muhammad Yunus
 Grameen Bank

References

External links
 The Yunus Centre - About the Yunus Centre
 Grameen Creative Lab - About Grameen Creative Lab

Think tanks based in Bangladesh
Social entrepreneurship
Economic development organizations